Pasuruan Regency is a regency in East Java, province of Indonesia. The capital of this regency is Bangil. It had a population of 1,512,468 at the 2010 Census and 1,605,969 at the 2020 Census. This total excludes the population of the city of Pasuruan, which lies geographically within this regency but is administratively separate from it. At present, there are moves under way to make Bangil the new administrative centre of Pasuruan Regency, with some offices being transferred from Pasuruan city to Bangil.

The Dutch spelling of the name of the regency was 'Pasoeroean'.

Administrative districts
Pasuruan Regency is divided into 24 districts (kecamatan), tabulated below with their areas and population totals from the 2010 Census and the 2020 Census. The table also includes the number of administrative villages (rural desa and urban kelurahan) in each district, and its postal codes.

References